Italy competed at the 1979 Summer Universiade in Mexico City, Mexico and won 10 medals.

In this edition Pietro Mennea established the world record of the 200 metres, holder till 1996, when Michael Johnson broke it.

Medals

Details

References

External links
 Universiade (World University Games)
 WORLD STUDENT GAMES (UNIVERSIADE - MEN)
 WORLD STUDENT GAMES (UNIVERSIADE - WOMEN)

1979
1979 in Italian sport
Italy